Association Sportive Béziers Hérault, often referred to by rugby media simply by its location of Béziers, is a French rugby union club currently playing in the second level of the country's professional rugby system, Pro D2. They earned their most recent promotion as 2011 Fédérale 1 champions, but the club also won 11 Top 14 titles since its establishment in 1911.

Béziers was a major force in French rugby throughout the 1970s and 1980s; however, at the end of 2004–05 season they were relegated to Pro D2. After some years playing in French second division, they finished bottom of the table in 2008–09 and were relegated to amateur Fédérale 1, before returning to Pro D2 after their 2011 title. They are based in Béziers in Occitania, and play at Stade Raoul-Barrière (capacity 18,555). The club colors are red and blue.

History
The club was established in 1911. Their first notable honour was being runners-up in the Coupe de France. However it would not be until the 1960s when the club began its rise to prominence. Béziers made their first championship appearance in the 1960 season. On May 22 they faced FC Lourdes in the final, losing 14 points to 11 in Toulouse. Béziers found mixed success during the 1960s following their first championship loss to Lourdes. The next season they won their first championship, defeating US Dax 6 points to 3 in Lyon. They were also runners-up in the Challenge Yves du Manoir that season. They also contested the domestic championship in 1962, though they lost to SU Agen 14 to 11 in the final. Béziers performed well in the 1964 season as well; losing the championship final to Section Paloise, and winning the Challenge Yves du Manoir.

After the success during the early 1960s Béziers became a powerful club in the 1970s. In 1971 Béziers made it to the final of the domestic championship; defeating RC Toulon 15 points to 9 in Bordeaux. The following season Béziers captured the championship, defeating Brive 9 points to nil in Lyon, and winning the Challenge Yves du Manoir as well. The club won championships in 1974 and 1975, defeating RC Narbonne and Brive respectively, both times at Parc des Princes in Paris. They were also involved in the 1976 final, though they lost to Agen, 13 to 10. The following season they won the championship again, defeating Perpignan 12 to 4 in the final. They also won the Challenge Yves du Manoir as well.

The next season they successfully defended their domestic title; defeating ASM Clermont Auvergne 31 points to 9 in the championship game in Paris. They however did not win back-to-back Challenge Yves du Manoir titles; though they came close, being runners-up. The success continued in the early 1980s as well, winning the championship of the 1980 season, defeating Toulouse 10 to 6 in the final, as well as being Challenge Yves du Manoir runners-up that season. Béziers repeated this again the next season; actually defeating Toulouse in the championship final again, and were runners-up in the Challenge Yves du Manoir. They were champions again in 1983 and 1984, defeating RC Nice and Agen in the finals respectively. They also won the Coupe de France in the 1986 season.

Béziers returned to the professional ranks in 2011–12 following their 13–6 win over Périgueux in the 2011 Fédérale 1 final on June 26. Both finalists were assured of promotion to Pro D2.

They struggled in their return season in Pro D2, finishing next-to last on the league table and well out of the safety zone. However, when ninth-place Bourgoin were forcibly relegated to Fédérale 1 for financial reasons, Béziers remained in Pro D2 for 2012–13.

Honours
 French championship:
 Champions: 1961, 1971, 1972, 1974, 1975, 1977, 1978, 1980, 1981, 1983, 1984
 Runners-up: 1960, 1962, 1964, 1976
 Challenge Yves du Manoir
 Champions: 1964, 1972, 1977
 Runners-up: 1961, 1973, 1978, 1980, 1981
 Coupe de France
 Champions: 1986
 Runners-up: 1950
 Fédérale 1
 Champions: 2011
 Elite 2
 Champions: 2000
coupe d'europe Fira
 Champions: 1962

Finals results

French championship

Challenge Yves du Manoir

Coupe de France

Trophée Jean-Prat (Fédérale 1)

Current standings

Current squad

The Béziers squad for the 2022–23 season is:

Espoirs squad

Notable former players

 
  Santiago González Bonorino
  Federico Todeschini
  Gonzalo Quesada
  Santiago Iglesias Valdez
  Matias Viazzo
  Rodney Iona
  Jye Mullane
  Josh Valentine
  Warwick Waugh
  Tyrone Viiga
  Anthony Hill
  Marc Andrieu
  Richard Astre
  Yoan Audrin
  Marc Baget
  David Banquet
  Raoul Barrière
  Pierre Bérard
  Mohamed Boughanmi
  Terry Bouhraoua
  André Buonomo
  Yvan Buonomo
  Adolphe Bousquet
  Sébastien Bruno
  Henri Cabrol
  Didier Camberabero
  Gilles Camberabero
  Jack Cantoni
  Alain Carminati
  Romain Carmignani
  Richard Castel
  Frédéric Cermeno
  Olivier Chaplain
  Arnaud Costes
  Pierre Danos
  Paul Dedieu
  Cédric Desbrosse
  Benjamin Desroches
  Michel Dieudé
  Richard Dourthe
  Jean-Frédéric Dubois
  Nicolas Durand
  Philippe Escande
  Alain Estève
  Michel Fabre
  Patrick Fort
  Philippe Gallart
  Camille Gérondeau
  Kevin Gimeno
  Jean-Philippe Grandclaude
  Steven Hall
  Jean-Pierre Hortoland
  Alain Hyardet
  Pierre Lacans
  Thibault Lacroix
  Julien Laharrague
  Félix Lambey
  Brice Mach
  Rémy Martin
  Jean-Paul Medina
  Alexandre Menini
  Ludovic Mercier
  Pierre Mignoni
  Brice Miguel
  Hakim Miloudi
  Yannick Nyanga
  Alain Paco
  Michel Palmié
  Jean-Pierre Pesteil
  Jean-Baptiste Peyras-Loustalet
  Jérôme Porical
  Thibaut Privat
  Jean-Luc Rivallo
  Olivier Saïsset
  Claude Saurel
  Jean Sébédio
  Cédric Soulette
  Dimitri Szarzewski
  Armand Vaquerin
  Vasil Katsadze
  Davit Khinchagishvili
  Irakli Machkhaneli
  Lasha Malaghuradze
  Lasha Lomidze
  Goderdzi Shvelidze
  Conrad Marais
  Andrew Mehrtens
  Lachie Munro
  Elijah Niko
  Alin Petrache
  Cristian Petre
  Augustin Petrechei
  Lucian Sîrbu
  Steve Fualau
  Robert Ebersohn
  Álvar Gimeno
  Suka Hufanga
  Winston Mafi
  Samiu Vahafolau
  Salesi Sika
  Seta Tuilevuka
  Albert Tuipulotu
  Andy Powell

See also
 List of rugby union clubs in France
 Rugby union in France

References

External links
  AS Béziers Hérault Official website

Beziers
Rugby clubs established in 1911
Sport in Béziers
AS Béziers
1911 establishments in France